Bela is an important city of Lasbela District in the Balochistan province of Pakistan. During the autumn of 325 BC, the settlement was part of the Asian campaign of Alexander the Great under the name Rhambacia. After Alexander conquered the town, he commended the place and thought that if he built a city there it would become great and prosperous and he left Hephaestion behind to built it.
In 711 AD, it was part of Muhammad bin Qasim's campaign under the name Armabil.

Name 
Alexander's historians mention the river name as Arabius, and local people as Oreitans. The Arab sources call it Armabil or Armanil. The Chachnama, in addition, uses the names Armael, Armana-Bil, Armapilla. It is described as the second port city of Sind, after Debal.

Demographics
Bela's population consists of Baloch and Sindhis. The population is predominantly Muslim with a small Hindu community.

Significance
Bela and surrounding areas have some mineral reserves.  north of Bela are the Kundi deposits where traces of chalcopyrite, Galena, and silver are also found. Manganese ore is also found in the ophiolitic belt of Bela. The tomb of Muhammad ibn al-Qasim's general, Muhammad ibn Haroon, is located in Bela.

See also
Shehr-e-Roghan - an ancient town near Bela
Alexandria in Orietai

References

 Sources
 
 
 

Populated places in Lasbela District